Mohamed Thakil  (born ) is an Egyptian male volleyball player. He was part of the Egypt men's national volleyball team at the 2014 FIVB Volleyball Men's World Championship in Poland. He played for Al Ahly.

Clubs
 Al Ahly (2014)

References

1986 births
Living people
Egyptian men's volleyball players
Place of birth missing (living people)
Volleyball players at the 2016 Summer Olympics
Olympic volleyball players of Egypt